Mohanyal is a former village development committee that is now a MOHANYALRURALMUNICIPALITY in Kailali District in Sudurpashchim Province of western Nepal. At the time of the 1991 Nepal census it had a population of 3917 living in 614 individual households.

References

External links
UN map of the municipalities of Kailali District

Populated places in Kailali District
Rural municipalities in Kailali District
Rural municipalities of Nepal established in 2017